Hypsiops is an extinct genus of oreodont of the family Merycoidodontidae endemic to North America. Fossils have been uncovered throughout the western U.S. in Oregon, Montana, Wyoming, and Nebraska.

References

Oreodonts
Cenozoic mammals of North America
Oligocene even-toed ungulates
Miocene even-toed ungulates
Prehistoric even-toed ungulate genera